The Korea Musical Awards is a representative awards ceremony held in January every year to revitalize the musical market and to encourage and congratulate the musicians who are working hard in the art scene. It is organized by Korea Musical Theater Association and supported by Ministry of Culture, Sports and Tourism, Arts Council Korea, and LG Arts Center, Seoul. First awards ceremony was held in 2016.

There were other musical awards with similar name in Korea from 1995 to 2013, hosted by the newspaper Sports Chosun, however it’s already discontinued.

Categories

Art 

 Grandprize
 Best Musical
 Best Musical Small Theater

Individual 

 Best Actress
 Best Actor
 Best Supporting Actress
 Best Supporting Actor
 Best New Actress
 Best New Actor
 Best Ensemble Award

Creation 

 Best Script
 Best Composer
 Best Music Director
 Best Choreography
 Best Director
 Best Staging Techniques
 Best Producer

Artwork

Best Musical Grand Prize

Best Musical (over 400 seats)

Best Musical Award Small Theater

Individual Division

Best Actress

Best Actor

Best Supporting Actress

Best Supporting Actor

Best New Actress

Best New Actor

Best Ensemble Award

Best Creative

Best Producer

Best Director

Best Playwright

Music Award Arrangement/Music Director

Composer Award

Best Choreography

Stage Arts Award

Special Award

Staff Award

New Wave Award

Special Merit Award

Award milestones
Some notable records and facts about the Korea Musical Awards include the following:

 The 2nd edition of awards. Maybe Happy Ending received the most awards by walking off with six trophies — Will Aronson for Best Music, Will Aronson and Hue Park for Best Book, Kim Dong-yeon for Best Director, Han Kyung-sook for Best Producer, Jeon Mi-do for Best Actress in a Leading Role and Best Small Theater Musical.
The 6th edition of awards was held at the Blue Square, Shinhan Card Hall on January 10, 2022. The nominations were announced on December 20, 2021. The musical Red Book was nominated for 7 categories: Best Musical, Best Leading Actress (Female), Best Supporting Actress (Male), Best New Artist (Female), Producer Award, Directing Award, and Music Award.

References

External links

 
Awards established in 1995
1995 establishments in South Korea
2017 establishments in South Korea
Musical theatre awards
South Korean theatre awards